Noah Ablett (4 October 1883 – 31 October 1935) was a Welsh trade unionist and political theorist who is most noted for contributing to 'The Miners' Next Step', a Syndicalist treatise which Ablett described as 'scientific trade unionism.

Ablett was born in 1883 in Porth, Rhondda to John and Jane Ablett; he was the tenth child of eleven. Originally intending to join the ministry, Ablett was turned to the plight of the poor pay and working conditions of the Rhondda coal miners. A keen learner, he won a scholarship to Ruskin College, Oxford in 1907 and while there was part of the college strike and subsequent movement that saw the creation of the Marxist educational group, the Plebs' League. On returning to the valleys he set up Marxist educational classes and was part of minimum wage agitation.

In 1911, Ablett became a checkweighman at Mardy Colliery in Maerdy and later that year was one of the founders of the Unofficial Reform Committee. The following year he was the main author of 'The Miners' Next Step', a pamphlet demanding a minimum wage for the miners and for the miners to take control of the mines. By 1919 Ablett was an executive of the South Wales Miners' Federation and was chairman of the board of governors of the Central Labour College. In 1919 Ablett was approached by the Labour Party to contest the Pembrokeshire constituency ahead of the 1922 general election. Ablett turned down the invitation, citing the demands of his other responsibilities. 1919 also saw the release of Ablett's sole book Easy outline of economics, published through the Plebs' League. Between 1921 and 1926 he was an executive member of the Miners' Federation of Great Britain.

In his later life, Ablett would struggle with alcoholism.  He died in 1935 in Merthyr Tydfil.

Notes

References
 

1883 births
1935 deaths
Alumni of Ruskin College
Welsh trade unionists
People from Porth
Welsh syndicalists
Plebs' League members